Metarranthis indeclinata, the pale metarranthi, is a species of geometrid moth in the family Geometridae. It is found in North America.

The MONA or Hodges number for Metarranthis indeclinata is 6825.

References

Further reading

 
 
 

Ennominae